Social Right may refer to:

 Social Right (faction), a faction within National Alliance
 Social Right (political party), a political party led by Luca Romagnoli

Political parties